Horner is an English and German surname that derives from the Middle English word for the occupation horner, meaning horn-worker or horn-maker, or even horn-blower.

People
Alison Horner (born 1966), British businesswoman
Arthur Horner (disambiguation), several people
Billy Horner (born 1942), English footballer and manager
Bob Horner (born 1957), American baseball player
Brigitta Horner (1632-1640), German child witch: see Witchcraft accusations against children 
Chris Horner (born 1971), American bicyclist
Christopher C. Horner, American attorney and author
Christian Horner (born 1973), team principal of the Red Bull Racing Formula One team
Chuck Horner (born 1936), American General
Constance Horner (born 1942), American public official and businesswoman 
Craig Horner (born 1983), Australian actor
Cynthia Horner, American writer and magazine editor
David Horner (born 1948), Australian military historian
Francis Horner (1778–1817), Scottish politician and economist
George William Horner (1849–1930), biblical scholar
Geri Horner (born 1972), British singer
Henry Horner (1879–1940), Illinois Governor
James Horner (1953–2015), American film composer
Jack Horner (disambiguation), the name of several persons
Jocelyn Horner (1902–1940), English sculptor
John Horner (disambiguation), the name of several persons
Johann Caspar Horner (1734–1834), Swiss physicist and astronomer
Johann Friedrich Horner (1831–1886), ophthalmologist, Horner's syndrome
John Henry Horner(1927–2004), also known as Cactus Jack , Canadian rancher, politician, and cabinet minister
Leonard Horner (1785–1864), Scottish geologist
Norman Gerald Horner (1882–1954), English physician and medical editor
Penelope Horner (born 1939), British actress
Phil Horner (born 1966), English footballer
Red Horner (1909–2005), Canadian hockey player
Stephanie Horner (born 1989), Canadian swimmer
Violet Horner, silent film actress
William Horner (cricketer) (1830–1905), English cricketer
William George Horner (1786–1837), British mathematician, the namesake of the Horner scheme
Yvette Horner (1922–2018), French accordionist

References 

English-language surnames
Occupational surnames